Roger Mortimer (or Roger de Mortimer) is the name of:

 Roger of Mortemer (fl. 1054 – after 1078)
 Roger Mortimer of Wigmore (before 1153 – before 8 July 1214), medieval marcher lord
 Roger Mortimer, 1st Baron Mortimer of Wigmore (1231–1282), a marcher lord
 Roger Mortimer, 1st Baron Mortimer of Chirk (c. 1256 – 1326)), a marcher lord
 Roger Mortimer, 1st Earl of March (1287–1330), English nobleman 
 Roger Mortimer, 2nd Earl of March (1328–1360), military commander during the Hundred Years' War
 Roger Mortimer, 4th Earl of March (1374–1398), heir presumptive to Richard II of England from 1385
 Roger Mortimer (racing) (1909–1991),  English horse-racing correspondent